William Edwin Adams (11 February 1832 – 13 May 1906) was an English Radical and journalist.

Adams was born in Cheltenham, Gloucestershire, England, the son of a tramping plasterer. He was influenced by the works of Thomas Paine and Giuseppe Mazzini, whom he regarded as "the greatest teacher since Christ". He also believed that community self-government and community representation to be "the essence of all political liberalism that is worthy of the name".

Adams believed that the American Civil War "was the greatest question of the centuries. It was greater than the Great Rebellion, greater than the French Revolution, greater than the war of Independence...as great as any that has been fought out since history began".

From 1864 until retiring in 1900, Adams was editor of the Newcastle Weekly Chronicle, where (under the pseudonym Ironside) he advanced internationalism, trade unionism, co-operatives and Lib-Labism. He deplored the rise of socialism in the 1880s and after a serious illness he abandoned politics for local concerns. These included bowling greens for workers, tree planting and free libraries and parks for the people. Due to worsening health, he spent winters in Funchal, Madeira, Portugal, where he died and was buried. A marble bust of Adams was unveiled by Thomas Burt MP on the first anniversary of his death.

Notes

Further reading
W. E. Adams, Memoirs of a Social Atom. In Two Volumes (London: 1903, reprinted with introduction by J. Saville, 1968). Available from the Internet Archive at https://archive.org/details/memoirsasociala00adamgoog
O. R. Ashton, W. E. Adams: Chartist, Radical and Journalist. 1832–1906 (Tyne and Weir, 1991).

1832 births
1906 deaths
Chartists
English male journalists